Samuel Kneeland (1696–1769) was an American printer and publisher of The Boston Gazette and Weekly Journal. Kneeland obtained much of his work printing laws and other official documents for the Province of Massachusetts Bay colonial government for about two decades. He printed the first Bible in the English language ever produced in the American colonies, along with many other religious and spiritual works, including the Book of Psalms. He was also noted for introducing a number of innovations to newspaper printing and journalism. He was one of many colonial printers who were strongly opposed to and outspoken against the Stamp Act in 1765.  Kneeland, primarily, along with his sons, were responsible for printing the greater majority of books, magazines and pamphlets published in Boston during his lifetime.

Early life and family heritage

Samuel Kneeland was born in Boston and entered into the printing business at about 1718. His parents were John Kneeland and Mary (Green) Kneeland, who had eight children, of which he was the third born. He was named after his grandfather, Samuel Green, a printer in Boston, and his great-grandfather, Samuel Green, of Cambridge, England, the publisher of the Cambridge Bible. His printing shop was located on Prison lane, now called Court Street, at the corner of Dorset's alley in Boston. This building was used for eighty years as a printing house by Kneeland and his sons and grandsons. On February 8, 1721, Kneeland married Mary Alden, of Boston, a granddaughter of Captain John Alden, a merchant, politician and sailor of Boston. He had respectable friends, who helped him get started in the printing business with the capitol to acquire the necessary printing materials when he became of age. His younger sister, Hannah Kneeland, born 1703, married Jeremiah Townsend, of Boston, on April 16, 1734. Kneeland was the father of four sons, all of whom became printers. Two of them, John and Daniel set up a press, and entered into partnership before their father's death, while other two were never to established their own businesses. Samuel Kneeland and his sons, with their various partnerships, continued to capture the greater large share of the printing business in Boston. It is estimated that between 1705 and 1785 three out of four books printed and published in Boston bore the Kneeland imprint.

Career 

Kneeland was apprenticed to Bartholomew Green, and was considered a good workman, industrious and earnest in his business manner. For many years he was a printer to the Province of Massachusetts Bay government and council, printing their laws, acts charters and journals and other legal documents. Sometime before 1740 Kneeland took on Daniel Fowle as an apprentice, who went on to become a successful printer. 

Kneeland, proposed to add a number of new features in his practice of journalism, including the introduction of an organized corps of correspondents of "the most knowing and ingenious gentlemen in several noted towns", to seek out and gather news. He also made proposed to publish on a weekly basis "the Number of Persons Buried and Baptized in the town of Boston". He also published a good number of journalistic essays.  He arranged for financial support from notable people of the town, including Mather Byles, Judge Danforth, Governor Burnet, and the Reverend Thomas Prince, of the Old South Church, of which Kneeland was a member.

Shortly after Kneeland established his printing shop he began printing religious books and pamphlets, for himself and for booksellers, before and during his partnership with Timothy Green, son of the elder Timothy Green. In 1726 Samuel Willard authored a massive work entitled A compleat body of divinity in two hundred and fifty expository lectures ... and commissioned Kneeland and Bartholomew Green to have the work printed, with its title page printed in rubrication. 

Kneeland & Green in 1727 printed the earliest known surviving example of The New England Primer, a religious text used in public schools for over two centuries. Historian Paul Leicester Ford believed that the first edition of The New England Primer was printed by Benjamin Harris in Boston, but examples of his printing are not known to exist.

Religious works 
In 1752 Kneeland and Green, commissioned by Daniel Henchman, one of Kneeland's principle customers, printed an edition of the King James Bible that was the first Bible printed in America in the English language. Because the British Crown owned the printing rights on the King James Bible it was illegal to print this bible in America. Subsequently the printing was conducted as privately as possible and bore the same London imprint of the edition from which it was copied, to avoid prosecution. In the process Kneeland was printing the first Bible ever produced from the Boston Press. The Kneeland and Green Bible was almost impossible to distinguish from the official English printings, as the type, paper, inks used in its production were all imported from England. There are no known surviving Kneeland & Green bibles, even though they had to be printed in appreciable numbers to make such a printing project commercially worthwhile. This Bible is considered Kneeland's most important work, though it was not recognized as such until after the revolution when it was legally safe to acknowledge its printer.

The first religious newspaper in the world, a weekly entitled The Christian History, was established by Reverend  Thomas Prince, of Boston, whose son, Thomas Jr. was the editor who commissioned Kneeland & Green in 1743 to conduct its printing. In its time it received much criticism and was only published for two years, but it remained an authoritative account in many aspects thereafter.

Boston Gazette and Weekly Journal

On December 21, 1719 The Boston Gazette, the second newspaper established in the colonies, made its first appearance. The Gazette throughout its history was distinguished for the spirited and often controversial political essays it offered. It was originally printed by James Franklin for William Brooker, its founder, but was given to Kneeland after a few months in 1720. By October the heading indicated: "Printed by S. Kneeland for Philip Musgrave, Post Master, at his Office in Corn-Hill."  This arrangement continued until 1726, when it was printed for Thomas Lewis, Boston's Postmaster. In 1727, Bartholomew Green took over the printing for Henry Marshall, another Postmaster. Marshall died in 1732, and John Boydell became the publisher, and the printing once again was done by Kneeland. 

Kneeland, went on to establish The New England Weekly Journal, published on Mondays, with its first issue appearing on March 20, 1727, along with  the inscription, "Containing the most Remarkable Occurrences Foreign and Domestick" below the title. It was the fourth newspaper to appear in the colonies. At this time Kneeland proposed a number of improvements to journalism and newspaper editing, including the organization of a corps of correspondents from different towns to share the latest news from each. A few months after, Kneeland formed a partnership with Timothy Green, father of Jonas Green, and established the printing firm of Kneeland and Green. Their partnership continued for twenty-five years. In 1736 they were commissioned to print and publish Thomas Prince's Chronological History of New England. By 1737 the Weekly Journal devoted itself more to the news than it did with literary work, with much of the news  culled from London newspapers, along with local Boston news and news accounts from other American colonies. Much of its news covered events that carried a more providential meaning. For example, the Weekly Journal covered the execution of Hugh Henderson, a habitual criminal, more than other newspapers.

After John Boydell, the proprietor of The Boston Gazette died, his heirs sold the paper for a modest sum to Kneeland and Green in 1741. They combined it with their Weekly Journal, and began publication of the Gazette under the new title of The Boston Gazette and Weekly Journal. The Journal was published for twenty-five years until the dissolution of their partnership, in 1752. 

Thereafter Kneeland opened a bookstore, and the printing of the Weekly Journal was managed by Green. After a few years he gave up his bookstore, and returned to the printing shop. After twenty-five years they dissolved their partnership, and Kneeland managed the business on his own. Not long after the dissolution of their partnership, Kneeland ceased publication of The Boston Gazette and Weekly Journal. A few months later he established another paper entitled The Boston Gazette and Weekly Advertiser in 1753.

In 1740 Boston had only four printing houses, belonging to John Draper, Rogers & Fowle, Thomas Fleet and Kneeland & Green. Three of them printed and edited their own newspapers: Draper, with the Boston News-Letter, Fleet with the Boston Evening-Post, while Kneeland & Green printed and edited the New-England Weekly Journal.

Pre American Revolution
During the years approaching the American Revolution,  most of Kneeland's printing contracts were with the Massachusetts General Court and Assembly. Between 1742 and 1759 he printed the Acts and Laws of the Great and General Court and Assembly, in numerous volumes, and the various charters. By 1759 he appealed for additional money for continuing in this great task, yet to be completed, claiming that inflation had increased the overall costs of printing the laws beyond the original twelve shillings a book previously agreed upon with the legislative committee in charge of printing. After considering Kneelan's situation and request in February 1763, the committee granted £50 paid on Kneeland's account. Early in January of the next year, Kneeland was back with a second request for additional funds. His complaint this time was that while the general court had ordered a new impression of the temporary laws from another printer, he left with a hundred obsolete law book which "..became as waste Paper", and was a burden he is not prepared to deal with. After a postponement the committee granted him another £100. Eventually he lost most of his government printing contracts because other printers were charging less. While he was charging 25 or 26 shillings a sheet, Green and Russell were offering to do the work for 20 shillings. Subsequently Kneeland ended up bankrupt and retired in 1765. He died on a Thursday, December 14, 1769 at the age of 73, leaving four sons, who were all printers. A widely esteemed member of the Boston community, Kneeland's funeral was attended by a very large gathering the following Saturday.

Works printed by Kneeland
Aside from newspaper publishing, Kneeland, often with his partner Timothy Green, printed bibles and a wide assortment of books and pamphlets, many of which were of a religious or spiritual nature. He also was commissioned as the official printer for over two decades printing the laws, acts and charters for the Massachusetts General Court and Assembly. In Charles Evans' works of 1803–1805, American Bibliography, volumes 1, 2 and 3, he outlines several hundred works printed by Kneeland himself, or in partnership as Kneeland & Green.

Evans, volumes 1, 2 and 3, lists more than 300 different works printed by Kneeland, or in partnership as Kneeland and Green. In particular, he lists many works they printed by the once acclaimed Reverend Thomas Prince, and by other ministers and clergymen. Below is a selection of works printed by Kneeland, depicting the general nature of the subjects involved:
 The Book of Psalms (1718)
 Mather, Cotton (1719). An Heavenly Life
 Mather, Cotton (1719). A Testimony against evil customs
 Coleman, Benjamin (1730). Dying in Peace in a Good Old Age
 Thatcher, Peter (1730). Man's frailty Practically Exhibited in his Life and Death
 Baxter, Richard (1731). A Call to the Unconverted to Turn and Live ...
 Edwards, Jonathan (1731). God Glorified in the Work of Redemption
 Greenwood, John (1731). The Temple of God to be Measur'd by his Ministers, According to the Word, as its Rule ...
 Loring, Samuel (1731). Ministers must Certainly and Shortly Die
 "A Lover of his Country" (1731). The Sinews of Trade. The State of the Province of Massachusetts
 Prince, Thomas (1731). The Vade Mecum for America: Or a companion for Traders and Travellers
 Dexter, Samuel (1738). Our Father's God, The Hope of Prosterity
 Dickinson, Jonathan (1738). The Reasonableness of Nonconformity to the Church of England, in Point of Worship
 Emerson, Joseph (1735). Meat out of the Eater, and Swiftness of the Strong
 Prince, Thomas (1735). Precious in the Sight of the Lord is the Death of His Saints
 Prince, Thomas (1736). A chronological history of New-England in the form of annals
 Loring, Israel (1738). False Hopes Discovered. A Sermon Preached at Concord
 Rand, William (1739). The Minister's Duty to Preach the Pure Word of God
 Chanler, Isaac (1740). New Converts Exhorted to Cleave to the Lord
 Ashley, Jonanthan (1742). The United Endeavors and earnest Prayers of Ministers and People, to Promote the Great Design of Ministry
 Prince, Thomas (1744). The Christian History, Containing Accounts of the revival and Propagation of Religion in Great-Britain and America
 Prince, Thomas (1748). The Fullness of Life and Joy in the Presence of God
 Prince, Thomas (1750).  The Nature and Moral Government and Agency of God in causing Droughts and Rains
 Kneeland and Green (1752). King James Bible, the first Bible printed in English to appear in the colonies
 Massachusetts Bay, Province (1753–1759). Acts and Laws, Passed by the Great and General Court and Assembly, in numerous volumes

See also
 Early American publishers and printers
 List of early American publishers and printers
 History of printing
 History of journalism
 History of American newspapers
 Newspapers of colonial America

Notes

Citations

Bibliography

 

 

 

 

 

 

 

 

 

 

 

 

 

 

 

 

 

 

1696 births
1769 deaths
People from colonial Boston
People of colonial Massachusetts
American publishers (people)
American printers
Colonial American printers
18th-century printers
18th-century American newspaper publishers (people)